Normand Lapointe (born 2 January 1939) was a Canadian businessman and politician. Lapointe was a Liberal party member of the House of Commons of Canada. He was an insurance agent by career.

Born in Saint-Victor, Quebec, Lapointe won Quebec's Beauce electoral district in the 1980 federal election and served in the 32nd Canadian Parliament. He left national politics after his defeat in the 1984 election by Gilles Bernier of the Progressive Conservative party.

External links
 

1939 births
Living people
Members of the House of Commons of Canada from Quebec
Liberal Party of Canada MPs
People from Beauce, Quebec